Dara Horn (born 1977) is a Jewish American novelist, essayist, and professor of literature. She has written five novels and in 2021, released a nonfiction essay collection titled People Love Dead Jews, which was a finalist for the 2021 Kirkus Prize in nonfiction. She won the Edward Lewis Wallant Award in 2002, the National Jewish Book Award in 2003 and 2006, and the Harold U. Ribalow Prize in 2007.

Early life and education
Horn was born in 1977 and grew up in Short Hills, New Jersey with three siblings. She attended Millburn High School and was co-captain of the Quiz Bowl team. Her mother, Susan, was an English teacher with a Ph.D in Jewish studies. Horn's father, Matthew, is a dentist. The family travelled internationally during her childhood, and her parents encouraged Horn and her siblings to write journals about their trips. When Horn was 14, she won a trip to Poland and Israel in a quiz competition about Israeli history, and then wrote an essay about her trip for Hadassah Magazine that was nominated for a National Magazine Award in 1993.

She received her BA in comparative literature, summa cum laude, in 1999 and her Ph.D. in comparative literature in Hebrew and Yiddish in 2006, both from Harvard University. She finished her master's degree in Hebrew literature at Cambridge University.

Career 
She taught classes in Jewish literature and Israeli history at Sarah Lawrence College and the City University of New York. She held the Weinstock visiting professorship in Jewish Studies at Harvard, teaching Yiddish and Hebrew literature.  Horn served as a Distinguished Visiting Scholar at Yeshiva University during the 2019–2020 academic year. She has also been a contributor to the New York Times and The Atlantic.

Books 
Horn's  first novel, In the Image, published by W. W. Norton when she was 25, received a 2003 National Jewish Book Award, the 2002 Edward Lewis Wallant Award.

Her second novel, The World to Come, also published by W. W. Norton in January 2006, received the 2006 National Jewish Book Award for Fiction, the 2007 Harold U. Ribalow Prize, was selected as an Editors' Choice in The New York Times Book Review and as one of the Best Books of 2006 by the San Francisco Chronicle, and has been translated into eleven languages.

Horn's third novel, All Other Nights, published in April 2009 by W. W. Norton, was selected as an Editors' Choice in the New York Times Book Review.

Her fourth novel, A Guide for the Perplexed, was published in September 2013.

Horn's fifth novel, Eternal Life, was published in January 2018 by W. W. Norton. It was selected as one of The New York Times''' 100 Notable Books of 2018.

Horn released her first nonfiction book, People Love Dead Jews, in 2021. The title is based on a 2018 Smithsonian Magazine article by Horn that began "People love dead Jews. Living Jews, not so much," which is reprinted in the book as an essay titled "Everyone's (Second) Favorite Dead Jew." According to Yaniv Iczkovits in the New York Times, the collection of twelve essays "explore how the different ways we commemorate Jewish tragedy, how we write about the Holocaust, how the media presents antisemitic events, how we establish museums to honor Jewish heritage, how we read literature with Jewish protagonists and even how we praise the "righteous among the nations" (those who saved Jews during the war), are all distractions from the main issue, which is the very concrete, specific death of Jews." The book was a finalist for the 2021 Kirkus Prize in nonfiction.

 Personal life 
She lives with her husband, daughter, and three sons in Short Hills. Horn has one brother and two sisters.

Bibliography
 
 
 
 
 
 

Honors
 2002 Edward Lewis Wallant Award
 2003 National Jewish Book Award
 2006 National Jewish Book Award 
 Best Books of 2006 by the San Francisco Chronicle Granta'' magazine, Best Young American Novelists, 2007
 2007 Harold U. Ribalow Prize
 Finalist, 2021 Kirkus Prize in nonfiction

References

External links
 Official website
 Interview at BookBrowse.com
 Story behind A Guide for the Perplexed - Online Essay by Dara Horn

Living people
1977 births
People from Millburn, New Jersey
21st-century American Jews
Millburn High School alumni
Harvard University alumni
Novelists from New Jersey
21st-century American women writers
American women novelists
21st-century American novelists
Jewish American novelists
21st-century American essayists
American women academics
Sarah Lawrence College faculty
21st-century American women educators
21st-century American educators